The Oirat-Kalmyk People's Congress, also known as the Chuulhn in Kalmyk Oirat Mongolian, is an unregistered organization claiming to represent the Kalmyk people of Russia.

History 
While the organization has its roots in Kalmyk nationalist organizations from the Soviet era, the first congress of the Oirat-Kalmyk people took place on 12 December 2015, in Elista, the capital city of Kalmykia, with around 200 popular delegates participating in total. A total of 3 congresses have been convened since 2015, the latest in May 2021.

Russo-Ukrainian war 
During the 2022 Russo-Ukrainian war the organization came out against the war publicly. The chairman of the congress, A.B. Sandzhyiev, stated that over the past 400 years Kalmyks participated in all military conflicts on the side of Russia, but that they cannot support a war with Ukraine. The People's Congress further stated that the war is harming the Kalmyk genetic pool for an "insane massacre in Ukraine", urging Kalmyks not to participate in the conflict.

On 27 October 2022, the Congress published a declaration of independence of Kalmykia and proclaimed the creation of an independent Kalmyk state.

Ideology and activity 
The main stated reason for the gathering of the congress was the issue of statehood, which Kalmykia, unlike all of Russia's other republics, does not legally possess. Other things that the congress sought to address were the right to Self-Determination, making the use of the Kalmyk-Oirat language obligatory in areas defined by local and federal laws, establishing a new constitution for the republic, as well as other economic, demographic, and political issues facing the Kalmyk people. 

The organization has also politically campaigned against Batu Khasikov's rule of Kalmykia and Dmitry Trapeznikov position as mayor of Elista, due to perceived incompetence and corruption. After large-scale protests, the Kremlin denied it was behind Trapeznikov's appointment to mayor. 

Following the start of the Russo-Ukrainian War in 2022, the Oirat-Kalmyk People's Congress joined hands with other minority activist groups from the Free Idel-Ural movement and Buryat mongols to form the "League of Free Nations". The stated goal of the league is to protect the rights of minority nations in Russia. Vladimir Dovdanov, a Kalmyk representative in the league, stated that what is most important is that Kalmyks are seen as subjects of the state, rather than disposable objects.

State persecution 
Numerous incidents of Oirat-Kalmyk People's Congress members being persecuted have been claimed by activists. The organizers of the congress were detained following a convocation in 2021. An Elista court then assigned them 50 hours of compulsory work for holding an unsanctioned public event. Members of the organization have also been branded as agents of Kyiv by the Russian government, being arrested after accusations of espionage.

References 

Nationalist organizations
Indigenous organizations in Russia
Separatism in Russia
Kalmykia
Politics of Kalmykia
History of Kalmykia
Nationalism in Russia
Nationalism in the Soviet Union
Nationalist movements in Europe